The men's 56 kg weightlifting competitions at the 1976 Summer Olympics in Montreal took place on 19 July at the St. Michel Arena. It was the eighth appearance of the bantamweight class.

Results

References

Weightlifting at the 1976 Summer Olympics